The aerobic gymnastics competition at the 2009 World Games were held from July 24 to July 25.

Medals table

Medals summary

 
2009 World Games
2009
2009 in gymnastics